is a maxi-single by CoЯe The Child, released on February 23, 2006. It was the second of a three-month release campaign by the band.

Track listing

Notes
The third song is a bonus track and is uncredited. It is played solely on piano, and parts of the song "Kyuumin -Oyasumi-" can be heard.

Personnel
Yuuki (勇企) – vocals, piano
Yuu (悠) - guitar
Shunsuke (俊介) - bass guitar
Shou (匠) - drums

2006 singles